Amucallia venezuelensis is a species of beetle in the family Cerambycidae. It was described by Galileo and Martins in 2010. It is known from Venezuela.

References

Calliini
Beetles described in 2010
Beetles of South America